Ophryastini is a weevil tribe in the subfamily Entiminae.

Genera 
Deracanthus – Ophryastes – Ophryastites – Sapotes

References 

 Jones, R.W. & C.W. O'Brien 2007: Review of the Genus Sapotes Casey (Coleoptera: Curculionidae: Entiminae) with Descriptions of Three New Species. The Coleopterists Bulletin 61(2): 208–223. 
 Lacordaire, T. 1863: Histoire Naturelle des Insectes. Genera des Coléoptères ou exposé méthodique et critique de tous les genres proposés jusqu'ici dans cet ordre d'insectes. Vol.: 6. Roret. Paris: 637 pp.
 Alonso-Zarazaga, M.A.; Lyal, C.H.C. 1999: A world catalogue of families and genera of Curculionoidea (Insecta: Coleoptera) (excepting Scolytidae and Platypodidae). Entomopraxis, Barcelona.

External links 

Entiminae
Beetle tribes